This article consists of the ITU and Ironman Triathlon events for 2018.

2018 ITU World Triathlon Series
 March 2: WTS #1 in  Abu Dhabi
 Elite winners:  Henri Schoeman (m) /  Rachel Klamer (f)
 April 28: WTS #2 in  Hamilton
 Elite winners:  Casper Stornes (m) /  Flora Duffy (f)
 May 12: WTS #3 in  Yokohama
 Elite winners:  Mario Mola (m) /  Flora Duffy (f)
 June 10: WTS #4 in  Leeds
 Elite winners:  Richard Murray (m) /  Vicky Holland (f)
 July 14: WTS #5 in  Hamburg
 Elite winners:  Mario Mola (m) /  Cassandre Beaugrand (f)
 July 27 – 29: WTS #6 in  Edmonton
 Elite winners:  Mario Mola (m) /  Vicky Holland (f)
 August 25 & 26: WTS #7 in  Montreal
 Elite winners:  Mario Mola (m) /  Vicky Holland (f)
 September 12 – 16: WTS Grand Final (#8) in  Gold Coast, Queensland
 Elite winners:  Vincent Luis (m) /  Ashleigh Gentle (f)
 Junior winners:  Csongor Lehmann (m) /  Cecilia Sayuri Ramirez Alavez (f)
 U23 winners:  Tayler Reid (m) /  Taylor Knibb (f)

World triathlon championships
 January 26 – 28: 2018 Cheile Gradistei ITU Winter Triathlon World Championships in 
 Elite winners:  Pavel Andreev (m) /  Yulia Surikova (f)
 Junior winners:  Kirill Drozdov (m) /  Alexandra Levkovich (f)
 U23 winners:  Eirik Bruland (m) /  Nadezhda Belkina (f)
 4x Mixed Relay winners:  (Daria Rogozina, Pavel Yakimov, Yulia Surikova, & Pavel Andreev)
 Junior 4x Mixed Relay winners: 
 July 6 – 14: 2018 ITU Multisport World Championships in  Fyn
 Duathlon
 Elite winners:  Andreas Schilling (m) /  Sandrina Illes (f)
 Junior winners:  Matthew Willis (m) /  Costanza Arpinelli (f)
 U23 winners:  Dely Arnaud (m) /  Lucie Picard (f)
 Cross triathlon
 Elite winners:  Rubén Ruzafa (m) /  Lesley Paterson (f)
 Junior winners:  Tate Haugan (m) /  Pavlina Vargova (f)
 U23 winners:  Marcello Ugazio (m) /  Penny Slater (f)
 Aquathlon
 Elite winners:  Emmanuel Lejeune (m) /  Edda Hannesdottir (f)
 Junior winners:  Valdemar Solok (m) /  Augusta Grønberg Christensen (f)
 U23 winners:  Nathan Breen (m) /  Sofiya Pryyma (f)
 Long Distance
 Elite winners:  Pablo Dapena Gonzalez (m) /  Helle Frederiksen (f)
 July 15: 2018 Hamburg ITU Triathlon Mixed Relay World Championships in 
 Mixed Relay winners:  (Leonie Periault, Dorian Coninx, Cassandre Beaugrand, & Vincent Luis)
 July 28: 2018 Edmonton ITU Triathlon Mixed Relay World Series in 
 Mixed Relay winners:  (Ashleigh Gentle, Aaron Royle, Natalie Van Coevorden, & Jacob Birtwhistle)
 August 31 – September 2: 2018 Kalmar FISU World University Triathlon Championship in 
 Elite winners:  Lars Pfeifer (m) /  Jeanne Lehair (f)
 Mixed Relay winners:  (Jeanne Lehair, Nathan Grayel, Mathilde Gautier, & Nathan Guerbeur)
 September 1 & 2: 2018 Zofingen ITU Powerman Long Distance Duathlon World Championships in 
 Elite winners:  Gaël Le Bellec (m) /  Petra Eggenschwiler (f)

Regional triathlon championships
 February 18: 2018 Bridgetown CAMTRI Sprint Triathlon American Cup and Central American and Caribbean Championship in 
 Elite winners:  John Rasmussen (m) /  Sophie Chase (f)
 February 24: 2018 Havana CAMTRI Middle Distance Triathlon Iberoamerican Championships in 
 Elite winners:  Michel Gonzalez Castro (m) /  Zeljka Milicic (f)
 March 3 & 4: 2018 Playa Hermosa CAMTRI Triathlon Youth and Junior Central American and Caribbean Championships in 
 Junior winners:  Sergio Quevedo Bermudez (m) /  Vanessa Espinoza Umaña (f)
 Youth winners:  Joshua Vincent Stewart Mendez (m) /  Yoana Griselda Tohom (f)
 March 10 & 11: 2018 Sarasota-Bradenton CAMTRI Sprint Triathlon American Cup and North American Championships in the 
 Elite winners:  Eli Hemming (m) /  Sophie Chase (f)
 Junior winners:  Andrew Shellenberger (m) /  Cecilia Sayuri Ramirez Alavez (f)
 U23 winners:  Eli Hemming (m) /  Erika Ackerlund (f)
 March 10 & 11: 2018 Montevideo CAMTRI Sprint Triathlon American Cup and South American Championships in 
 Elite winners:  Luciano Taccone (m) /  Romina Biagioli (f)
 Junior winners:  Miguel Hidalgo (m) /  Gabrielle Lemes (f)
 U23 winners:  Diego Moya (m) /  Maria Inti Guzman (f)
 Youth winners:  Bruno Perillo (m) /  Julieta la Cruz (f)
 4 x Junior Mixed Relay winners:  (Marcela Alvarez Saez, Cristobal Baeza, Daniela Moya, & Roberto Porras)
 March 30: 2018 Sharm El Sheikh ATU Sprint Triathlon African Cup and Pan Arab Triathlon Championships in 
 Elite winners:  Bence Bicsák (m) /  Yuliya Yelistratova (f)
 Junior winners:  Omar Abushabab (m) /  Mariam Shaban (f)
 Youth winners:  Siefeldin Ismail (m) /  Maram Elshafie (f)
 U23 winners:  Bence Bicsák (m) /  Noémi Sárszegi (f)
 April 28: 2018 Pokhara NTT ASTC Triathlon South Asian Championships in 
 Elite winners:  Minachandra Singh (m) /  Isora Sosa (f)
 June 17: 2018 Subic Bay ASTC Triathlon Southeast Championships in 
 Elite winners:  John Chicano (m) /  Kim Kilgroe (f)
 July 7: 2018 Cholpon-Ata ASTC Sprint Triathlon Asian Cup and Central Asian Championships in 
 Elite winners:  Michael Lori (m) /  Arina Shulgina (f; Russia)
 August 3 & 4: 2018 Kupiškis ETU Triathlon Baltic Championships in 
 Elite winners:  Mikita Bely (m) /  Hanna Maksimava (f)
 August 18: 2018 Sokcho ASTC Sprint Triathlon Asian Cup and East Asian Championships in 
 Elite winners:  Yuichi Hosoda (m) /  Arina Shulgina (f; Russia)
 September 1: 2018 Fredericia ETU Triathlon Nordic Championships in 
 Elite winners:  Andreas Schilling (m) /  Alberte Kjær Pedersen (f)
 September 15 & 16: 2018 Ohrid ETU Triathlon Balkan Championships in 
 Elite winners:  Ognjen Stojanović (m) /  Vida Medic (f)
 Junior winners:  Luka Grgorinic (m) /  Tjasa Vrtacic (f)
 October 26 & 27: 2018 Aqaba ASTC Sprint Triathlon Asian Cup and West Asian Championships in 
 Elite winners:  Michael Lori (m) /  Zsanett Bragmayer (f)
 November 11: 2018 Santo Domingo CAMTRI Sprint Triathlon American Cup and Iberoamerican Championships in 
 Elite winners:  William Huffman (m) /  Elizabeth Bravo (f)
 November 23: 2018 Luxor ATU Duathlon African Championships and Pan Arab Duathlon Championships in 
 Elite winners:  Moussa Karich (m) /  Basmla Elsalamoney (f)
 Junior winners:  Mohamed Aziz Sebai (m) /  Syrine Fattoum (f)
 U23 winners:  Mohanad Elshafei (m) /  Basmla Elsalamoney (f; default)
 Youth winners:  Yassine Bradai (m) /  Haidy Taymour (f)
 December 1: 2018 OTU Triathlon Pacific Islands Championships in 
 Elite winners:  Benjamin Zorgnotti (m) /  Leilanie Guerry-Wong Foo (f)

2018 ITU Triathlon World Cup
 February 11: TWC #1 in  Cape Town
 Elite winners:  Richard Murray (m) /  Vicky Holland (f)
 March 10: TWC #2 in  Mooloolaba
 Elite winners:  Richard Murray (m) /  Emma Jeffcoat (f)
 March 25: TWC #3 in  New Plymouth
 Elite winners:  Declan Wilson (m) /  Kirsten Kasper (f)
 April 14 & 15: TWC #4 in  New Orleans
 Event cancelled, due to potential event-standard fears.
 May 5 & 6: TWC #5 in  Chengdu
 Elite winners:  Rostyslav Pevtsov (m) /  Emma Jeffcoat (f)
 May 19: TWC #6 in  Astana
 Elite winners:  Dmitry Polyanski (m) /  Sandra Dodet (f)
 June 2: TWC #7 in  Cagliari
 Elite winners:  Delian Stateff (m) /  Lisa Perterer (f)
 June 10: TWC #8 in  Huatulco
 Elite winners:  Rodrigo González (m) /  Chelsea Sodaro (f)
 June 17: TWC #9 in  Antwerp
 Elite winners:  Jelle Geens (m) /  Summer Cook (f)
 July 7 & 8: TWC #10 in  Tiszaújváros
 Note: Due to hail and thunderstorms, the men's event was cancelled.
 Women's Elite winner:  Sophie Coldwell
 August 18: TWC #11 in  Lausanne
 Elite winners:  Gustav Iden (m) /  Nicola Spirig (f)
 September 1 & 2: TWC #12 in  Karlovy Vary
 Elite winners:  Dmitry Polyanski (m) /  Vendula Frintová (f)
 September 22: TWC #13 in  Weihai
 Elite winners:  Gustav Iden (m) /  Taylor Spivey (f)
 September 29 & 30: TWC #14 in  Madrid
 Event cancelled, due to water quality fears.
 October 13: TWC #15 in  Sarasota-Bradenton
 Elite winners:  Vincent Luis (m) /  Renee Tomlin (f)
 October 21: TWC #16 in  Salinas
 Elite winners:  David Castro Fajardo (m) /  Yuliya Yelistratova (f)
 October 27: TWC #17 in  Tongyeong
 Elite winners:  Max Studer (m) /  Ai Ueda (f)
 November 10: TWC #18 (final) in  Miyazaki
 Elite winners:  Vicente Hernández (m) /  Summer Cook (f)

European Triathlon Union (ETU)
 February 17: 2018 Piano Vetore–Etna ETU Winter Triathlon European Championships in 
 Elite winners:  Pavel Andreev (m) /  Yulia Surikova (f)
 Junior winners:  Alberto Rabellino (m; default) /  Polina Tarakanova (f; default)
 U23 winners:  Alessandro Saravalle (m) /  Nadezhda Belkina (f)
 May 6: 2018 Vejle ETU Powerman Middle Distance Duathlon European Championships in 
 Elite winners:  Søren Bystrup (m) /  Sandrina Illes (f)
 July 19 – 22: 2018 Tartu ETU Triathlon European Championships in 
 Elite winners:  Richard Varga (m) /  Sophie Coldwell (f)
 Junior winners:  Vetle Bergsvik Thorn (m) /  Pauline Landron (f)
 August 9 – 11: 2018 Glasgow ETU Triathlon European Championships in 
 Elite winners:  Pierre Le Corre (m) /  Nicola Spirig (f)
 Mixed Relay winners:  (Leonie Periault, Pierre Le Corre, Cassandre Beaugrand, & Dorian Coninx)
 August 30 – September 2: 2018 Loutraki ETU Triathlon Youth European Championships Festival in 
 Youth winners:  Connor Bentley (m) /  Libby Coleman (f)
 Mixed Youth Relay winners:  (Libby Coleman, Fynn Batkin, Freya Thomson, & Connor Bentley)
 September 23: 2018 Madrid ETU Challenge Long Distance Triathlon European Championships in 
 Elite winners:  Timothy Van Houtem (m) /  Laura Siddall (f)
 October 6: 2018 Lisbon ETU Triathlon Mixed Relay Clubs European Championships in 
 Mixed Relay winners:  (Leonie Periault, Anthony Pujades, Cassandre Beaugrand, & Aurelien Raphael)
 Junior Mixed Relay winners:  (Marine Vetillard & Axel Hamon)
 October 19 – 21: 2018 Eilat ETU Triathlon U23 European Championships in 
 U23 winners:  Max Studer (m) /  Julie Derron (f)
 October 20 – 28: 2018 Ibiza ETU Multisport European Championships in 
 Duathlon
 Elite winners:  Yohan le Berre (m) /  Sandra Levenez (f)
 Junior winners:  Romaric Forques (m) /  Laura Swannet (f)
 U23 winners:  Arnaud Dely (m) /  Irene Loizate Sarrionandia (f)
 Middle Distance Triathlon
 Elite winners:  Giulio Molinari (m) /  Alexandra Tondeur (f)
 Cross Duathlon
 Elite winners:  Tim van Hemel (m) /  Kristina Lapinova (f)
 Men's Junior winner:  Nicolas Puertas Fernandez
 U23 winners:  Evgenii Evgrafov (m) /  Daria Rogozina (f)
 Cross Triathlon
 Elite winners:  Tim van Hemel (m) /  Nicole Walters (f)
 Junior winners:  Nicolas Puertas Fernandez (m) /  Marta Menditto (f)
 U23 winners:  Marcello Ugazio (m) /  Sofiya Pryyma (f)
 Aquathlon
 Elite winners:  Sergiy Kurochkin (m) /  Bianca Seregni (f)
 Junior winners:  Luka Grgorinic (m) /  Bianca Seregni (f)
 U23 winners:  Samuel Dickinson (m) /  Antoanela Manac (f)

Confederación Americana de Triathlon (CAMTRI)
 March 10: 2018 Sarasota-Bradenton CAMTRI Paratriathlon American Championships in the 
 Note: There was no PTS3 events here.
 PTWC winners:  Fernando Aranha (m) /  Ahalya Lettenberger (f)
 PTS2 winners:  Mark Barr (m) /  Hailey Danz (f)
 PTS4 winners:  Jamie Brown (m) /  Andrea Walton (f; default)
 PTS5 winners:  Chris Hammer (m) /  Grace Norman (f)
 PTVI winners:  Aaron Scheidies (m) /  Jessica Tuomela (f)
 June 23 & 24: 2018 Brasília CAMTRI Triathlon American Championships in 
 Elite winners:  Manoel Messias (m) /  Luisa Baptista (f)
 U23 winners:  Manoel Messias (m) /  Vanesa de la Torre (f)
 August 19: 2018 Santiago CAMTRI Duathlon American Championships in 
 Elite winners:  Diego Moya (m) /  Marcela Alvarez Saez (f)
 October 14: 2018 Sarasota-Bradenton CAMTRI Triathlon Mixed Relay American Championships in the 
 Mixed Relay winners:  (Renee Tomlin, Jason West, Taylor Spivey, & Morgan Pearson)

Oceania Triathlon Union (OTU)
 January 14: 2018 St. Kilda OTU Paratriathlon Oceania Championships in 
 Note: There was no women's PTS2 & PTS3 events here.
 PTWC winners:  Alex Welsh (m) /  Sara Tait (f)
 Men's PTS2 winner:  Brant Garvey
 Men's PTS3 winner:  Justin Godfrey (default)
 PTS4 winners:  Clint Pickin (m) /  Sally Pilbeam (f)
 PTS5 winners:  Joshua Kassulke (m) /  Sharon Dagg (f)
 PTVI winners:  Gerrard Gosens (m) /  Shannon Cleave (f; default)
 February 4: 2018 Glenelg OTU Triathlon Mixed Relay Oceania Championships in 
 4x Mixed Relay winners:  (Nicole Van Der Kaay, Ryan Sissons, Andrea Hewitt, & Tayler Reid)
 February 17: 2018 Devonport OTU Sprint Triathlon Oceania Cup and OTU Sprint Triathlon Oceania Championships in 
 Elite winners:  Brandon Copeland (m) /  Emma Jeffcoat (f)
 U23 winners:  Brandon Copeland (m) /  Annabel White (f)
 March 25: 2018 New Plymouth OTU Triathlon Oceania YOG Qualifier and Junior Oceania Championships in 
 Junior winners:  Lorcan Redmond (m) /  Desirae Ridenour (f)
 Youth winners:  Dylan McCullough (m) /  Charlotte Derbyshire (f)
 April 8: 2018 St. Kilda OTU Triathlon Oceania Cup and OTU Triathlon Oceania Championships in 
 Elite winners:  Sam Ward (m) /  Natalie Van Coevorden (f)
 U23 winners:  Callum McClusky (m) /  Elise Salt (f)

Asian Triathlon Confederation (ASTC)
 March 3 & 4: 2018 Putrajaya ASTC Powerman Middle Distance Duathlon Asian Championships in 
 Elite winners:  Thomas Bruins (m) /  Annamária Eberhardt-Halász (f)
 May 6: 2018 Hong Kong ASTC Triathlon Junior Asian Championships in 
 Junior winners:  Oscar Coggins (m) /  Nanami Nakayama (f)
 May 12 & 13: 2018 Gunsan ASTC Long Distance Triathlon Asian Championships in 
 Elite winners:  Aliaksandr Vasilevich (m) /  Hanna Maksimava (f)
 June 24: 2018 Gamagōri ASTC Triathlon U23 Asian Championships in 
 U23 winners:  Takumi Hojo (m) /  Niina Kishimoto (f)
 August 10: 2018 Mt Mayon (Legazpi) ASTC Paratriathlon Asian Championships in the 
 Note: There were no PTS3, Women's PTS4, & Women's PTS5 events here.
 PTWC winners:  Jumpei Kimura (m) /  Wakako Tsuchida (f; default)
 PTS2 winners:  Kenshiro Nakayama (m) /  Yukako Hata (f; default)
 Men's PTS4 winner:  WANG Jiachao
 Men's PTS5 winner:  Tetsuki Kaji
 PTVI winners:  CHU Kin Wa (m) /  Atsuko Maruo (f)
 October 20: 2018 Hong Kong ASTC Aquathlon Asian Championships in 
 Elite winners:  KOK Yu Hang (m) /  HOI Long (f)
 Junior winners:  Daryn Konysbayev (m) /  LO Ho Yan (f)
 U23 winners:  KOK Yu Hang (m) /  CHANG Chi-Wen (f; default)

African Triathlon Union (ATU)
 April 21 & 22: 2018 Rabat ATU Triathlon African Championships and YOG Qualifier in 
 Elite winners:  Badr Siwane (m) /  Gillian Sanders (f)
 Junior winners:  Jamie Riddle (m) /  Amber Schlebusch (f)
 U23 winners:  Gregory Ernest (m) /  Shanae Williams (f)
 Men's Youth winner:  Steffens Luke

2018 ITU World Paratriathlon Series
 May 12 & 13: WPS #1 in  Yokohama
 PTWC winners:  Jetze Plat (m) /  Wakako Tsuchida (f)
 PTS2 winners:  Mark Barr (m) /  Allysa Seely (f)
 PTS3 winners:  Justin Godfrey (m) /  Elise Marc (f; default)
 PTS4 winners:  Alexis Hanquinquant (m) /  Mami Tani (f)
 PTS5 winners:  George Peasgood (m) /  Lauren Steadman (f)
 PTVI winners:  Dave Ellis (m) /  Susana Rodriguez (f)
 June 30: WPS #2 in  Iseo-Franciacorta
 PTWC winners:  Jetze Plat (m) /  Lauren Parker (f)
 PTS2 winners:  Mark Barr (m) /  Allysa Seely (f)
 PTS3 winners:  Daniel Molina (m) /  Elise Marc (f; default)
 PTS4 winners:  Mikhail Kolmakov (m) /  Anna Plotnikova (f)
 PTS5 winners:  George Peasgood (m) /  Lauren Steadman (f)
 PTVI winners:  Dave Ellis (m) /  Alison Patrick (f)
 July 27 – 29: WPS #3 (final) in  Edmonton
 Note: There were no PTS3 events here.
 PTWC winners:  Alexandre Paviza (m) /  Wakako Tsuchida (f)
 PTS2 winners:  Mark Barr (m) /  Allysa Seely (f)
 PTS4 winners:  Oliver Dreier (m) /  Cassie Cava (f; default)
 PTS5 winners:  Stefan Daniel (m) /  Grace Norman (f)
 PTVI winners:  Jonathan Goerlach (m) /  Elizabeth Baker (f)

2018 ITU Paratriathlon World Cup
 February 17: PWC #1 in  Devonport, Tasmania
 Note: There was no women's PTS3 and PTS5 events here.
 PTWC winners:  Bill Chaffey (m) /  Emily Tapp (f)
 PTS2 winners:  Brant Garvey (m) /  Yukako Hata (f, default)
 Men's PTS3 winner:  Justin Godfrey (default)
 PTS4 winners:  Mikhail Kolmakov (m) /  Sally Pilbeam (f)
 Men's PTS5 winner:  Joshua Kassulke
 PTVI winners:  Jonathan Goerlach (m) /  Katie Kelly (f; default)
 April 14 & 15: PWC #2 in  New Orleans
 Event cancelled, due to potential event-standard fears.
 May 5 & 6: PWC #3 in  Águilas
 Note: There was no women's PTS3 event here.
 PTWC winners:  Ahmed Andaloussi (m) /  Eva María Moral Pedrero (f)
 PTS2 winners:  Maurits Morsink (m) /  Rakel Mateo Uriarte (f; default)
 Men's PTS3 winner:  Daniel Molina
 PTS4 winners:  Alejandro Sánchez Palomero (m) /  Evgeniya Koroleva (f; default)
 PTS5 winners:  Jairo Ruiz Lopez (m) /  Alisa Kolpakchy (f)
 PTVI winners:  Héctor Catalá Laparra (m) /  Susana Rodriguez (f)
 May 28: PWC #4 in  Eton Dorney
 PTWC winners:  Joseph Townsend (m) /  Jade Jones (f)
 PTS2 winners:  Andrew Lewis (m) /  Melissa Stockwell (f)
 PTS3 winners:  Ryan Taylor (m) /  Nora Hansel (f; default)
 PTS4 winners:  Steven Crowley (m) /  Hannah Moore (f; default)
 PTS5 winners:  Martin Schulz (m) /  Lauren Steadman (f)
 PTVI winners:  Dave Ellis (m) /  Alison Patrick (f)
 June 16 & 17: PWC #5 in  Besançon
 PTWC winners:  Ahmed Andaloussi (m) /  Lauren Parker (f)
 PTS2 winners:  Vasily Egorov (m) /  Saskia van den Ouden (f; default)
 PTS3 winners:  Max Gelhaar (m) /  Elise Marc (f; default)
 PTS4 winners:  Oliver Dreier (m) /  Anna Plotnikova (f; default)
 PTS5 winners:  Martin Schulz (m) /  Gwladys Lemoussu (f)
 PTVI winners:  Lazar Filipovic (m) /  Annouck Curzillat (f)
 July 14: PWC #6 in  Magog, Quebec
 Note: There was no PTS3 and no women's PTS4 events here.
 PTWC winners:  Antonio Daniel Muller (m) /  Kendall Gretsch (f)
 PTS2 winners:  Brant Garvey (m) /  Lyne-Marie Bilodeau (f; default)
 Men's PTS4 winner:  WANG Jiachao
 PTS5 winners:  José Abraham Estrada Sierra (m) /  Kamylle Frenette (f; default)
 PTVI winners:  Jon Dunkerley (m) /  Jessica Tuomela (f; default)
 August 18: PWC #7 in  Lausanne
 PTWC winners:  Ahmed Andaloussi (m) /  Mona Francis (f; default)
 PTS2 winners:  Andrew Lewis (m) /  Liisa Lilja (f; default)
 PTS3 winners:  Charl Parkin (m; default) /  Elise Marc (f; default)
 PTS4 winners:  Alexis Hanquinquant (m) /  Mami Tani (f)
 PTS5 winners:  George Peasgood (m) /  Emilie Gral (f)
 PTVI winners:  Arnaud Grandjean (m) /  Katie Kelly (f)
 October 14: PWC #8 in  Sarasota-Bradenton
 Note: There was no women's PTS2, PTS3, and women's PTS5 events here.
 PTWC winners:  Nic Beveridge (m) /  Jessica Ferreira (f)
 Men's PTS2 winner:  Adam Popp
 PTS4 winners:  Andrew Nicholson (m) /  Kelly Elmlinger (f)
 Men's PTS5 winner:  Juan Carlos Cano Espinoza
 PTVI winners:  Yuichi Takahashi (m) /  Elizabeth Baker (f)
 October 27 & 28: PWC #9 (final) in  Funchal
 Note: There was no women's PTS3 event here.
 PTWC winners:  Mark Conway (m) /  Christiane Reppe (f)
 PTS2 winners:  Stuart Meikle (m) /  Liisa Lilja (f)
 Men's PTS3 winner:  José Mendonça (default)
 PTS4 winners:  WANG Jiachao (m) /  Megan Richter (f; default)
 PTS5 winners:  Martin Schulz (m) /  Alisa Kolpakchy (f)
 PTVI winners:  Anatolii Varfolomieiev (m) /  Amy Dixon (f)

World Triathlon Corporation
 Main Ironman Championships'''
 April 15: 2018 Standard Bank Ironman African Championship in  Nelson Mandela Bay Metropolitan Municipality
 Winners:  Kyle Buckingham (m) /  Lucy Charles (f)
 April 28: 2018 Memorial Hermann Ironman North American Championship in  The Woodlands, Texas
 Winners:  Matt Hanson (m) /  Melissa Hauschildt (f)
 June 10: 2018 Cairns Airport Ironman Asia-Pacific Championship in  Cairns
 Winners:  Braden Currie (m) /  Teresa Adam (f)
 July 8: 2018 Mainova Ironman European Championship in  Frankfurt
 Winners:  Jan Frodeno (m) /  Daniela Ryf (f)
 October 13: 2018 Ironman World Championship in  Kailua, Hawaii County, Hawaii
 Winners:  Patrick Lange (m) /  Daniela Ryf (f)
 December 2: 2018 Ironman South American Championship in  Mar del Plata
 Winners:  Michael Weiss (m) /  Sarah Crowley (f)

 Main Ironman 70.3 Championships
 June 17: 2018 KMD Ironman 70.3 European Championship in  Elsinore
 Winners:  Rodolphe von Berg (m) /  Melissa Hauschildt (f)
 September 1 & 2: 2018 Ironman 70.3 World Championship in  Nelson Mandela Bay Metropolitan Municipality
 Winners:  Jan Frodeno (m) /  Daniela Ryf (f)
 November 4: 2018 Ironman 70.3 South American Championship in  Buenos Aires
 Winners:  Rodolphe von Berg (m) /  Pâmella Oliveira (f)
 November 25: 2018 Ironman 70.3 Western Sydney (Asia-Pacific) Championship in 
 Winners:  Terenzo Bozzone (m) /  Radka Kahlefeldt (f)  	
 December 8: 2018 Ironman 70.3 Middle East Championship in  Manama
 Winners:  Kristian Blummenfelt (m) /  Holly Lawrence (f)

References

External links
 International Triathlon Union
 IRONMAN Official Site

 
2018 sport-related lists
Triathlon by year